An adjective phrase (or adjectival phrase) is a phrase whose head is an adjective. Almost any grammar or syntax textbook or dictionary of linguistics terminology defines the adjective phrase in a similar way, e.g. Kesner Bland (1996:499), Crystal (1996:9), Greenbaum (1996:288ff.), Haegeman and Guéron (1999:70f.), Brinton (2000:172f.), Jurafsky and Martin (2000:362). The adjective can initiate the phrase (e.g. fond of steak), conclude the phrase (e.g. very happy), or appear in a medial position (e.g. quite upset about it). The dependents of the head adjective—i.e. the other words and phrases inside the adjective phrase—are typically adverb or prepositional phrases, but they can also be clauses (e.g. louder than you are). Adjectives and adjective phrases function in two basic ways, attributively or predicatively. An attributive adjective (phrase) precedes the noun of a noun phrase (e.g. a very happy man). A predicative adjective (phrase) follows a linking verb and serves to describe the preceding subject, e.g. The man is very happy.

Attributive vs. predicative
The adjective phrases are underlined in the following example sentences. The head adjective in each of these phrases is in bold, and how the adjective phrase is functioning—attributively or predicatively—is stated to the right of each example:

The distinguishing characteristic of an attributive adjective phrase is that it appears inside the noun phrase that it modifies. An interesting trait of these phrases in English is that an attributive adjective alone generally precedes the noun, e.g. a proud man, whereas a head-initial or head-medial adjective phrase follows its noun, e.g. a man proud of his children. A predicative adjective (phrase), in contrast, appears outside of the noun phrase that it describes, usually after a linking verb, e.g. The man is proud of his children.

Adjective vs. adjectival
There is a tendency to call a phrase an adjectival phrase when that phrase is functioning like an adjective phrase, but is not actually headed by an adjective. For example, in Mr Clinton is a man of wealth, the prepositional phrase of wealth modifies a man in a manner similar to how an adjective phrase would, and it can be reworded with an adjective, e.g. Mr Clinton is a wealthy man. A more accurate term for such cases is phrasal attributive or attributive phrase.

Constituency tests 
Constituency tests can also be used to identify adjectives and adjective phrases. Here are the three constituency tests, according to X-bar theory, that prove the adjective phrase is both a constituent, and an AP.

In the following tests, consider the sentence: Sam ordered a very spicy pizza.

Semantic ambiguity 
Although constituency tests can prove the existence of an AP in a sentence, the meanings of these AP may be ambiguous. This ambiguity must be considered when considering the semantic versus pragmatic meaning. The following examples prove two things: 
 Adjective phrases that are pre-nominal create ambiguous interpretations.
 Head adjectives that move to post-nominal position creates unambiguous interpretations.

Note: This section can be added into the adjectives page, but ambiguity can also apply to adjective phrases. Additionally, comma placements and intonations may have a role in figuring out ambiguity, but English has a written form of communication that is more ambiguous than spoken communication.

The following examples show the different interpretive properties of pre- and post-nominal adjectives which are inside adjective phrases.

Intersective versus non-intersective interpretation of AP 

This example showed then entire adjective phrase moving, creating the same ambiguity as example 1. Therefore, the placement of the adjective relative to the subject is important for creating unambiguous statements.

Restrictive versus non-restrictive interpretation of AP 

The adjective blessed is ambiguous in pre-nominal position because it creates a restrictive and a nonrestrictive interpretation (a), while in post-nominal position it only displays a restrictive interpretation (b). Plus, when the main adjective of the adjective phrase is moved to post-nominal position, only one interpretation is possible.

There is cross-linguistic validity, according to the multiple articles referenced in Cinque's article, which studied this adjective placement in Italian as well. Cinque discovered that exactly the same pattern was seen in Italian, because ambiguous interpretations only appeared when the adjective phrase was placed in pre-nominal position. Next, other research articles also confirm that this word order phenomenon exists in Mandarin Chinese, creating ambiguous interpretations. For example, an adjective phrase with the head adjective private in pre-object position, creates two interpretations. On the other hand, an adjective phrase with the head adjective private placed in post-object position only creates one interpretation.

Tree diagram representations
The structure of adjective phrases (and of all other phrase types) can be represented using tree structures. There are two modern conventions for doing this, constituency-based trees of phrase structure grammars and dependency-based trees of dependency grammars. Both types of trees are produced here. The important aspect of these tree structures—regardless of whether one uses constituency or dependency to show the structure of phrases—is that they are identified as adjective phrases by the label on the top node of each tree.

Head-final adjective phrases 
The following trees illustrate head-final adjective phrases, i.e. adjective phrases that have their head adjective on the right side of the phrase:

 

The labels on the nodes in the trees are acronyms: A = adjective, Adv = adverb, AP = adjective phrase, N = noun/pronoun, P = preposition, PP = prepositional phrase. The constituency trees identify these phrases as adjective phrases by labeling the top node with AP, and the dependency trees accomplish the same thing by positioning the A node at the top of the tree.

Head-initial adjective phrases 
The following trees illustrate the structure of head-initial adjective phrases, i.e. adjective phrases that have their head on the left side of the phrase:

Head-medial adjective phrases 
The following trees illustrate the structure of head-medial adjective phrases:

See also

Adjective
Clause
Dependency grammar
Head (linguistics)
Linking verb
Phrase
Phrase structure grammar
Predicative expression

Notes

References

Brinton, L. 2000. The structure of modern English: A linguistic introduction. 
Bolinger, D. 1967. Adjectives in English: Attribution and predication. Lingua18: 1–34.
Carnie, A. 2013. Syntax: A generative introduction. Oxford, UK: Wiley-Blackwell.
Cinque, G. (2014). The semantic classification of adjectives. A view from syntax. Studies in Chinese Linguistics. 35. 1-30. 
Crystal, D. 1997. A dictionary of linguistics and phonetics, 4th edition. Oxford, UK: Blackwell Publishers.
Culicover, Peter and Ray Jackendoff. 2005. Simpler Syntax. Oxford University Press: Oxford.
Eroms, H.-W. 2000. Syntax der deutschen Sprache. Berlin: de Gruyter.
Greenbaum, S. 1996. The Oxford English grammar. New York: Oxford University Press. 
Haegeman, L. and J. Guéron 1999. English Grammar: A generative perspective. Oxford, UK: Blackwell Publishers.
Jurafsky, M. and J. Martin. 2000. Speech and language processing. Dorling Kindersley (India): Pearson Education, Inc.
Kesner Bland, S. 1996. Intermediate grammar: From form to means and use. New York: Oxford University Press.
Osborne, T. 2003. The left elbow constraint. Studia Linguistica 57, 3: 233–257.
Ouhalla, J. 1994. Transformational grammar: From principles and parameters to minimalism. London: Arnold.
Radford, A. 2004. English syntax: An introduction. Cambridge, UK: Cambridge University Press.
Sportiche, D., Koopman, H. J., & Stabler, E. P. (2014). An introduction to syntactic analysis and theory. Chichester: Wiley-Blackwell.
Starosta, S. 1988. The case for lexicase. London: Pinter Publishers.

Grammar
Syntactic categories